New York Female Giants was an all woman baseball team from around 1913. In 1913 there were 32 players divided between the red and blue New York Female Giants teams. In 1913 a team member, seventeen year old Helen Zenker, was arrested for selling programs at their game that was held on a Sunday violating the blue laws.  Ida Schnall was captain of the team.

Team
Ida Schnall team captain pitcher
Miss May McCullum, catcher
Miss Ryan
Miss Helen Zenker third baseman

References

External links
New York Female Giants at the Library of Congress
New York Female Giants from the Library of Congress at Flickr

Defunct baseball teams in New York (state)
Women's baseball teams in the United States
Amateur baseball teams in New York (state)
1913 establishments in New York (state)
Baseball teams established in 1913
Baseball teams disestablished in 1913
Women's sports in New York (state)